"Asleep in the Deep" is a song written by Arthur J. Lamb and composed by Henry W. Petrie in 1897. It is titled after a refrain at the end of the song. The phrase "asleep in the deep" refers to those who have drowned. The lyrics allude to those who have met such a fate, while at sea.

In popular culture

A German version of the song was composed on verses of Martell, under the title "Des Seemanns Los" (The Sailor's Fate).

The song has been recorded by J. W. Myers (1902), Frank Stanley (1907), Gus Reed (Edison Records, 1908), Wilfred Glenn (1913), Al Jolson (1916), Charles Laird (1920), The Mills Brothers (1939), Coleman Hawkins (1940), Pete Daily's Chicagoans (1952), Firehouse Five Plus Two (1957), The Dukes of Dixieland (1958), Bill Cullen's Minstrel Spectacular (1959), Chet Atkins (My Brother Sings, 1959), Bing Crosby (101 Gang Songs, 1961), Thurl Ravenscroft (Walt Disney's Pirates of the Caribbean, 1966), and Turk Murphy's Jazz Band (1973).

The song features in Buster Keaton's film The Navigator (1924).

The 1928 song "Ever Since the Movies Learned to Talk" includes the lyric: 

Norman Chaney, as Chubby, performs a lip-synched version of the song sung by Charley Chase in the 1931 Our Gang film Little Daddy.

An excerpt of the lyrics is sung by Goofy in the 1937 American animated short film Clock Cleaners produced by Walt Disney. As Goofy is washing the bell of the clocktower, he repeatedly sings "Loudly the bell in the old tower rings". Another example is from the 1937 short film, Mickey's Amateurs, in which through the introductory credits Pete's voice sings the same excerpt before the scene opens on the ring of the gong, signifying rejection, though Pete persistently repeats the excerpt while the mechanical hands pull him off the stage.

The song is the background at the beginning of the Warner Brothers' Merrie Melodies cartoon Wackiki Wabbit (1943), while the two shipwrecked sailors are adrift.

The song is featured in the Little Golden Books title "The Little Boy with a Big Horn" by Jack Bechdolt (1950).

The song is widely used as a running cameo in The Adventures of Rocky and Bullwinkle and Friends, usually with the excerpt "Many brave hearts are asleep in the deep, so beware, beware".

The first few lines, referred to as "Stormy the Night" are sung in Act 2, Scene 16 of Aufstieg und Fall der Stadt Mahagonny by Bertolt Brecht and Kurt Weill.

References
 
 ingeb.org
 parlor songs

External links

1913 recording by Wilfred Glenn
Thurl Ravenscroft sings the song

English folk songs
Songs about oceans and seas
Songs about sailors
Songs about death
Maritime music
Songs with lyrics by Arthur J. Lamb
1897 songs